"Tour de France 2003" is a maxi single released by German electronic music band Kraftwerk. It was released as the lead single from their tenth studio album, Tour de France Soundtracks (2003), on 7 July 2003. It contains three different versions, along with one extended mix, of the composition "Tour de France 2003", listed on the album as "Tour de France Étape 1", "Tour de France Étape 2", and "Tour de France Étape 3".

Track listing
CD single
"Tour de France 2003 (Version 1)" – 3:27
"Tour de France 2003 (Version 2)" – 3:25  
"Tour de France 2003 (Version 3)" – 3:36
"Tour de France 2003 (Long Distance Version 2)" – 7:44

12-inch single

Side A
"Tour de France 2003 (Long Distance Version 2)" – 7:44
Side B
"Tour de France 2003 (Version 1)" – 3:27
"Tour de France 2003 (Version 3)" – 3:36

Charts

References

External links
 

2003 singles
2003 songs
Kraftwerk songs